Abinsk is a town and the administrative center of Abinsky District of Krasnodar Krai, Russia, located  southwest of Krasnodar, the administrative center of the krai. Population: 39,058 (2020),    23,000 (1968).

It was previously known as Abinskaya (until 1963).

History
Abinsk was founded in 1836 on the site of a former Circassian settlement. The site was originally a Cossack village, which served the Russian Empire as one of the fortresses north of the Caucasus. At the same time, the settlement served as a place of exile, in particular, the Decembrists Bestuzhev, Odoevsky and Katenin were exiled here. It was known as Abinskaya before 1963.

Administrative and municipal status
Within the framework of administrative divisions, Abinsk serves as the administrative center of Abinsky District. As an administrative division, it is, together with four rural localities, incorporated within Abinsky District as the Town of Abinsk. As a municipal division, the Town of Abinsk is incorporated within Abinsky Municipal District as Abinskoye Urban Settlement.

References

Notes

Sources

External links
Official website of Abinsk 
Directory of organizations in Abinsk 

Cities and towns in Krasnodar Krai
Abinsky District
Populated places established in 1863
1863 establishments in the Russian Empire